David Hertz may refer to:

 David B. Hertz (?–2011), operations research practitioner and academic
 David Randall Hertz (born 1960), American architect, inventor and educator